"I Am" is the third and final single from Train's self-titled debut album, released to US rock radio in October 1999. The song was first included on the album Road Songs (Seismic) in 1996.

Track listing
 "I Am" (radio version)
 "I Am" (album edit)
 "I Am" (album version)

Charts

Release history

References

1998 songs
1999 singles
Columbia Records singles
Train (band) songs